İvanovka is a village and municipality in the Ismailli District of Azerbaijan. The municipality consists of the villages of İvanovka and Külüllü. This is the last village in Azerbaijan with a significant population belonging to the Russian ethnic religious community of Molokans. This is the last place in the world where Kolkhoz (collective farms) from Soviet times are preserved.

History 
The village was founded in 1834 by Russian peasants, predominantly Molokans from central Russia, that had been resettled in the Caucasus by Tsar Nicholas I in the years following the Treaty of Turkmenchay at the end of the Russo-Persian War (1826–1828). Further Russian peasants migrated to the area over time. These were mostly Molokans and some Doukhobors, coming from the cities of Tambov, Voronezh, Rostov and Stavropol. In 1840, the village was named İvanovka, after the founder – Ivan Perschi.

In 1936, three cooperation of three artels joined into one collective farm. This collective farm exists even nowadays and is only working collective farm in Azerbaijan. In 1971, the leader of collective farm Nikolay Nikitin got the award of “Hero of Socialist Labor”. Under his leadership, Ivanovka's collective farm became one of the biggest in the Republic. In 1995, collective farm was renamed in name of Nikitin.

In 2005, the Molocan church was celebrating its 200th anniversary.

Culture 

The first Russian houses in this area were built in 1834. Molokan families came to this area to follow their own form of Spiritual Christianity and to maintain their religion.

The local people who were deported from Russia speak Azerbaijani, while Russian remains their mother tongue. Their most famous meal is called Lapsha – a type of pasta noodles. Lapsha is eaten at every local activity, including at wedding and on holidays. The majority of the songs of the Ivanovka Russian group are dedicated to the beauty of nature of this village.

There are some new buildings: a school, library, hospital, kindergarten, maternity home, electronic telephone/internet system (ATS), museum.

The museum is operating in Ivanovka village's school. There you can see traditional life's attributes such as clothes, furniture, ceramic dishes, tools, books, photos.

House of Prayer 
There is no church in the village. But there is a prayer house where people go to pray together. This house is not open to tourists, and it is forbidden for it to be photographed.

House of culture 
In the house of culture, various events such as weddings, presentations, celebrations are held. In 2018 president has signed a decree of renovating the house of culture. 2.5 million were allocated for a renovation.

Molokans 

Molokan religion is a member of various Spiritual Christian sects evolved from East Christianity. The Molokan church doesn't conform Orthodox church, nor Catholic, nor Protestant. They tend to name themselves as Spiritual Christians.

According to their beliefs they:

 Do not recognize cross and icons
 consider the consumption of pork and alcohol as sin, as well as smoking and drug use
 do not recognize the veneration of saints
 recognize the worship of God only "in spirit and truth"

Molokans aren't considered to be a single church, rather a religion with the same roots. Each Molokan diaspora has its own religious songs, way of life, celebrations.

Education 
The school operating in Ivanovka has a capacity of 783 people. Most of the students are studying in the Russian language.

Demographics 
The population is 2720.

Economics 

Agriculture accounts for the main business of the population, and the local Kolkhoz is still in good use. The crops that are cultivated are mostly grapes, wheat, sunflowers, and peas. Livestock are also reared (beef-breeding, pig-breeding, poultry), and cheese is produced for the local market.

There are some parks, workshops, and factories (e.g. a Tiling factory) .

See also 
 Lahij
 Kulullu
 Khinalug

References

External links 

 Ivanovka.net (ru)

Populated places in Ismayilli District